Motilimonas is a Gram-negative, non-spore-forming and facultatively anaerobic genus of bacteria from the family Alteromonadales with one known species (Motilimonas eburnea). Motilimonas eburnea has been isolated from marine sediments from Weihai in China.

References

Alteromonadales
Bacteria genera
Monotypic bacteria genera